Old Santa Fe Depot of Guthrie is a former railway station in Guthrie, Oklahoma. Built in 1903, it still stands at its original site, 403 West Oklahoma Avenue.  The building is currently in use by the local restaurant: Gage’s Steakhouse.

Status
This is no longer a working depot. Santa Fe Railroad ceased operating passenger trains to Guthrie, and Amtrak does not stop here any longer. Back in the early 1900s, during the period when Guthrie as the capital of Oklahoma Territory, there were up to 40 trains stopping here every day. One of the famous Harvey House restaurants was located inside the building.

The building has been recognized as a contributing resource of the Guthrie Historic District.

In June 2021, Amtrak released a plan that would add two more round trips between Oklahoma City, Oklahoma and Fort Worth, Texas while extending the original round trip to Newton, Kansas. The extended round trip would bring Amtrak service back to Guthrie. A timeline for the service has not been determined.

Description

The Santa Fe Depot on the east side of the tracks on Guthrie's west side was constructed in 1903. It is 185 ft. long and 85 ft. wide at its widest point. Unlike most frame depots of its time, this is a red brick depot, with a two-story section at the center and one-story wings to each side. The station lobby was in the middle of the ground floor, and was reached by doors on both the east and west sides of the building.

Notes

References

Atchison, Topeka and Santa Fe Railway stations
Buildings and structures in Logan County, Oklahoma
Fred Harvey Company
Railway stations in Oklahoma
Defunct museums in Oklahoma
Guthrie, Oklahoma
Railway stations in the United States opened in 1903
1903 establishments in Oklahoma Territory
Railway stations closed in 1979
Former Amtrak stations in Oklahoma
Repurposed railway stations in the United States